The Diocese of Lucera-Troia, sometimes called Nocera, is a Roman Catholic bishopric in Apulia, in southern Italy, with its episcopal seat at Lucera Cathedral. The diocese reached its present configuration in 1986, by combining the older diocese of Lucera with the diocese of Troia, the seat of which was Troia Cathedral, now a co-cathedral of the united diocese.

Ecclesiastical history

Lucera
Local tradition traces the origin of the bishopric of Lucera to the third century and Saint Bassus. Two other imaginary bishops, Johannes and Marcus, first appear in a martyrology written in the 11th or 12th century, whose authority is usually rejected. Pope Gelasius I (492–496) wrote to two local bishops, complaining about the attack on the Monastery in Fundo Luciano in the territory of the diocese of Lucera led by two priests of the diocese of Lucera, and orders the bishops to advise the (unnamed) bishop of Lucera to go to the monastery to ensure that attacks against the clergy should not take place. The first historically certain bishop is Marcus (c. 743).

It was in the 1220s, under Bishop Bartolomaeus, that Frederick II began the settlement of Sicilian Saracens at Lucera.

In 1391, the diocese of Lucera was increased by the addition of the bishopric of Castel Fiorentino (Farentino), a city founded in 1015 by the Byzantine catapan Basil Mesardonites, and the place of Emperor Frederick II's death.

After 1409, the diocese of Tortiboli - created before 1236 -  was united to Lucera. In 1969, the name (though not the diocese) was revived under its Latin name Tortibulum.

In 1609, 1687, and 1759, the diocese of Lucera is attested as a suffragan of the archdiocese of Benevento.

Troia
Around 1031, the diocese of Troia is attested as being directly subject to the pope. This was confirmed by Pope Paschal II in a bull of 10 November 1100, granting the bishops of Troia the right to be consecrated by the pope in perpetuum.

In 1127, Count Roger II of Sicily presented Pope Honorius II (1124–1130) with a large gift of gold and silver, and promised him the towns of Troia and Montefusco, if the pope would grant him the standard and title of Duke of Apulia. In November 1127, Pope Honorius was in Troia, where he held a council, in which he excommunicated Count Roger and anyone who should support his efforts to become Duke of Apulia. On 5 December 1127, the pope granted Troia a charter of constitutions and liberties. He also turned aside the leaders of Apulia, fearing the creation of a Norman kingdom in southern Italy.

On 31 December 31, 1963, the diocese of Troia

The cathedral of Troia, dedicated to the Virgin Mary, was administered by a Chapter of twenty canons, headed by four dignities (led by the Archdeacon, and the Archpriest). In 1675, there were four dignities and sixteen canons. In 1752, there were four dignities and twelve canons.

Pope Urban II held a synod at Troia on 11–12 March 1093, at which fifty-five bishops were in attendance.

Post-Napoleonic restoration
Following the extinction of the Napoleonic Kingdom of Italy, the Congress of Vienna authorized the restoration of the Papal States and the Kingdom of Naples. Since the French occupation had seen the abolition of many Church institutions in the Kingdom, as well as the confiscation of most Church property and resources, it was imperative that Pope Pius VII and King Ferdinand IV reach agreement on restoration and restitution. Ferdinand, however, was not prepared to accept the pre-Napoleonic situation, in which Naples was a feudal subject of the papacy. Neither was he prepared to accept the large number of small dioceses in his kingdom; following French intentions, he demanded the suppression of fifty dioceses. Lengthy, detailed, and acrimonious negotiations ensued. On 17 July 1816, King Ferdinand issued a decree, in which he forbade the reception of any papal document, including    without prior reception of the royal exequatur. This meant that prelates could not receive bulls of appointment, consecration, or installation without the king's permission.

A concordat was finally signed on 16 February 1818, and ratified by Pius VII on 25 February 1818. Ferdinand issued the concordat as a law on 21 March 1818. The re-erection of the dioceses of the kingdom and the ecclesiastical provinces took more than three years. The right of the king to nominate the candidate for a vacant bishopric was recognized, as in the Concordat of 1741, subject to papal confirmation (preconisation). On 27 June 1818, Pius VII issued the bull De Ulteriore in which the metropolitan archdiocese of Benevento was restored. The united dioceses of Montecorvino and Vulturaria were permanently suppressed and added to the territory of the diocese of Lucera. Lucera continued as a suffragan of Benevento.

The diocese of Troia had been immediately subject to the Holy See in 1752, and it remained so under the new arrangements in the Kingdom of Naples in 1818.

Post-Vatican-II changes
Following the Second Vatican Council, and in accordance with the norms laid out in the council's decree, Christus Dominus chapter 40, Pope Paul VI ordered a reorganization of the ecclesiastical provinces in southern Italy. The decree "Eo quod spirituales" of 12 September 1976 created a new episcopal conference in the region called "Basilicata". Pope Paul VI ordered consultations among the members of the Congregation of Bishops in the Vatican Curia, the Italian Bishops Conference, and the various dioceses concerned.

On 30 April 1979, Pope John Paul II continued the reorganization by promoting the diocese of Foggia to the rank of metropolitan archbishopric, and assigned to its new ecclesiastical province the dioceses of Siponto, Troia (which had been directly subject to the Holy See), Ausculo e Cerignola, Bovino, Lucera, Santo Severino and Vestana.

On 18 February 1984, the Vatican and the Italian State signed a new and revised concordat. Based on the revisions, a set of Normae was issued on 15 November 1984, which was accompanied in the next year, on 3 June 1985, by enabling legislation. According to the agreement, the practice of having one bishop govern two separate dioceses at the same time, aeque personaliter, was abolished. The Vatican continued consultations which had begun under Pope John XXIII for the merging of small dioceses, especially those with personnel and financial problems, into one combined diocese.

On September 30, 1986, the diocese of Troia was united with Lucera to form the diocese of Lucera–Troia, as a suffragan of the also reconstituted Metropolitan Archdiocese of Foggia-Bovino. Both its cathedral in Lucera and its co-cathedral in Troia have the rank of minor basilica.

Bishops

Diocese of Lucera
Erected: 4th Century
Latin Name: Lucerina

to 1450

...
Anastasius (attested 558–560) 
...
Lando (attested 1061–1068)
...
Benedictus (1096–1099)
Robertus (attested 1127)
...
Andreas (attested 1221–c. 1225)
Bartolomeus (attested 1225)
Guilelmus de Ricia ( ? –1294)
Aimardus (1295–1302)
Stephanus (1302– ? )
Jacobus ( ? –1322)
Augustinus (Gazotti), O.P. (1322–1323)
Jacobus
Rogerius
Martinus
Antonius (1348–1363)
Jacobus Gauga (Gurga) (1363–1373)
Bartholomaeus de Aprano (1373–1378)
Antonius, O.Min. (1378–1393) Avignon Obedience
Thomas (1381– ? ) Roman Obedience
Thomas of Acerno (1378–1381) Roman Obedience
Bartholomaeus ( ? ) Roman Obedience

Territory Added: 1391 from the suppressed Diocese of Fiorentino

Nicolaus Antonius, O.P. (1394–1422) Avignon Obedience
Battistachius de Formica (1396– ? ) Roman Obedience
Battistachius de Formica (1422-1450)
Territory Added: 1409 from the suppressed Diocese of Tortiboli

1450 to 1700

Ladislao Dentice (1450–1476 Died) 
Pietro Ranzano, O.P. (1476–1492 Died) 
Giambattista Contestabili (1493–1496 Died) 
Antonio Torres, O.S.H. (1496–1497 Appointed, Bishop of Nepi e Sutri) 
Raffaele Rocca (1497–1499 Appointed, Bishop of Capri) 
Giovanni Di Luigi, O. Carm. (1499–1512 Appointed, Bishop of Sant'Agata de' Goti) 
Alfonso Carafa (1512–1534)
Andrea Matteo Palmieri (1534–1535 Resigned) 
Michele Visconti (1535–1538 Died) 
Enrique de Villalobos Xeres (1538–1540 Appointed, Bishop of Squillace) 
Fabio Mignanelli (1540–1553 Appointed, Administrator of Grosseto) 
Pietro de Petris (1553–1580 Died) 
Giulio Monaco (1580–1581 Died) 
Scipione Bozzuti (1582–1591 Died) 
Marco Magnacervo, C.R. (1593–1600 Died)
Fabio Aresti (1601–1609 Died)
Lodovico Magio (1609–1618 Died)
Fabrizio Suardi (Alessandro) (1619–1637 Appointed, Bishop of Caserta)
Bruno Sciamanna (1637–1642 Appointed, Bishop of Caserta) 
Tommaso D'Avalos, O.P. (1642–1642 Died)
Silvestro D'Afflitto, C.R. (1643–1661 Died)
Giambattista Eustachio (1663–1687 Died)

1700 to 1986

Domenico Morelli (1688–1716)
Domenico Maria de Liguori (Liguoro), C.R. (1718–1730)
Vincenzo Ferrero, O.P. (1730–1733)  
Michael Marculli (1733–1759 Died) 
Giuseppe Maria Foschi (1759–1776 Died) 
Giovanni Arcamone, C.R. (1792–1793 Died) 
Alfonso Maria Freda (1798–1816 Died)

Territory Added: 1818, from the suppressed Diocese of Vulturara e Montecorvino

Andrea Portanova (1818–1840 Died) 
Giuseppe Iannuzzi (1843–1871 Died) 
Giuseppe Maria Cotellessa (1872–1889 Died) 
Carmelo Ciotola (1891–1892 Died) 
Giuseppe Consenti, C.SS.R. (1893–1907 Died) 
Lorenzo Chieppa (1909–1918 Died) 
Giuseppe di Girolamo (1920–1941 Resigned) 
Domenico Vendola (1941–1963 Resigned) 
Antonio Cunial (1963–1970 Appointed, Bishop of Vittorio Veneto) 
Angelo Criscito (1970–1985 Retired) 
Carmelo Cassati, M.S.C. (1985–1986 Resigned)

Diocese of Troia

to 1200

 Orianus (c. 1022 – c. 1028)
 Angelus (1028 – 4 May 1041)
Johannes (1041–1059)
 Arduinus (mentioned in 1059)
 Stephen the Norman (March 1059 – 11 October 1077)
 Gualterius Frangente (2 November 1077 – 4 August 1087)
 Gerard of Piacenza (8 October 1087 – 10 January 1097)
 Hubertus Cenomanicus (20 June 1097 – 13 December 1101)
 Guglielmus Bigoctus (13 January 1102 – 1108)
 Guglielmo (1108 – after 1127?)
 Honorius
 William (mentioned in 1140)
 Guglielmo (1168)
 Elias (mentioned in 1177)
 Guillelmus (attested 1180–1187)
 Roggerius (1187–1189)
 Gualterius de Palearia (1189– July 1201) deposed

1200 to 1500

 Petrus (attested 1201–1206)
 Philippus (13 October 1212– ? )
...
 Matteo de Barbuco (20 January 1252 – c. April 1270)
(Bishop Matteo in exile 1252–1266)
Sede vacante (1270–1276)
 Bertero (1276–1277)
Sede vacante (1277–1278)
 Ugo de Curtis, O.P. (1278–1279) 
 Rainerio, O.F.M. (1280–1284)
 Rogerio, O.F.M. (1284–1302)
 Pietro, O.F.M. (9 September 1302 – 1309)
 Guglielmo Bianchi, O.S.B. (1309–1310)
 Beraldo (1311–1322)
 Arnaldo (1322–1332)
 Bisanzio (1332–1341)
 Enrico Trezza (1341 – 1361?)
 Nicola de Cesis (17 November 1361 – ?)
 Guido (? – 1366)
 Bartolomeo (13 September 1387 – ?) Roman Obedience
 Riccardo (1391–1393) Avignon Obedience
 Nicola di Giovinazzo (1393?–1409) Avignon Obedience
 Angelo di Manfredonia (1410–1438) Roman Obedience
 Giacomo Lombardo (4 July 1438 – 1468)
 Giovanni Paolo Vassalli (1469–1474)
 Stefano Grube (1474?–1480)
 Scipione Piscicelli (1480–1484)

1500 to 1800

 Giannozzo Pandolfini (1484–1525)<ref>Pandolfini was a member of the Florentine nobility. He was appointed by Pope Sixtus IV on 10 March 1484. His name occurs on the façade of the Palazzo Pandolfini in Florence, placed after the election of Clement VII in 1523: "Gianozzo Pandolfini, Bishop of Troia, erected from the foundations aided by the greatest benefices from the popes Leo X and Clement VII in the year 1520." He was appointed castellan of the Castel S'Angelo by Clement VII. His nephew was appointed coadjutor for him on 17 February 1524. He died on 13 December 1525, at the age of sixty-eight, and was buried in Ss. Silvestro e Martino ai Monte in Rome. Ughelli I, p. 1347. Eubel II, p. 257 with note 3. V. Forcella, Inscrizioni delle chiese e d'altri edifici di Roma Volume IV (Roma: Fratelli Bencini 1874), p. 41, no. 95. Michael Linghor, "Palace and Villa: Spaces of Patrician Self-definition," in: Roger J Crum, Roger J. Crum, John T. Paoletti (edd.), Renaissance Florence: A Social History, Cambridge University Press 2006), p. 269.</ref>
 Ferrando Pandolfini (1525–1560)
 Scipione Rebiba (1560) Apostolic Administrator Prospero Rebiba (1560–1593)
 Jacopo Aldobrandini (1593–1606)
 Pietro Antonio Da Ponte, CR (1607–1622)
 Giovanni Battista Roviglioni (9 January 1623 – December 1623)
 Felice Siliceo (18 December 1623 – 1626)
 Giovanni Battista Astalli (19 January 1626 – 17 August 1644)
 Giovanni Tommaso Veneziani (30 January 1645 – 1647)
 Antonio Sacchetti (13 January 1648 – June 1662)
 Sebastiano Sorrentino (12 February 1663 – 17 July 1675)
 Antonio de Sangro, CR (1675–1694)
 Emilio Giacomo Cavalieri (1694–1726)
 Giovanni Pietro Faccoli (11 September 1726 – 2 January 1752)
 Marco De Simone (17 July 1752 – 24 February 1777)
 Giovanni Giacomo Onorati (1777–1793)
 Sede vacante (1793–1797) Gennaro Clemente Francone (1797–1799)

1800 to 1986Sede vacante (1799–1804) Michele Palmieri (1804–1824)
 Antonio Monforte (3 May 1824 – 13 February 1854)
 Tommaso Passero, O.P. (16 July 1856 – 8 September 1890)
 Domenico (Daniele) Tempesta, O.F.M.Ref. (1891–1899)
 Paolo Emilio Bergamaschi (19 June 1899 – 26 July 1910), resigned
 Domenico Lancellotti (21 April 1911 – 14 March 1918, transferred to Conversano)
 Fortunato Maria Farina (21 June 1919 – 15 May 1951), resigned
 Giuseppe Amici (15 May 1951 – 1º February 1955, transferred to Cesena)
 Antonio Mistrorigo (9 March 1955 – 25 June 1958, transferred to Treviso)
 Antonio Pirotto (24 August 1958 – 14 December 1974), retired
 Giuseppe Lenotti (14 December 1974 – 28 January 1981)
 Salvatore De Giorgi (4 April 1981 – 30 September 1986), resigned

Diocese of Lucera-TroiaUnited: 30 September 1986Latin Name: Lucerina-TroianaRaffaele Castielli (1987–1996 Resigned) 
Francesco Zerrillo (1997–2007 Retired) 
Domenico Cornacchia (2007–2016)
•Giuseppe Giuliano (20 Oct 2016 Appointed - )

References

Bibliography

  
 
 
 
 

Studies
Antonetti, Antonio (2013). "Le elezioni episcopali e i vescovi della rinascita troiana (1266-1284),"  in: Carte di Puglia Anno XV, no. 2 (2013), pp. 31–42.
Antonetti, Antonio (2014). "Alcune note sulla Chiesa lucerina tra Bizantini e Normanni (secc. X-XII),"  In:Itinerari di ricerca storica, 2014 n.2, pp. 99–119.
Antonetti, Antonio (2015). "I vescovi di Lucera del XIII secolo: note per una cronotassi scientifica." . In: Archivio storico pugliese 68 (2015), pp. 51–79.
Antonetti, Antonio (2017). "La documentazione vescovile lucana nella prima età angioina (1266-1310). Una messa a punto della questione." . In: F. Panarelli (ed.), Alle fonti della Basilicata medievale: edizioni, progetti e cantieri (Bari 2017), pp. 161–198.
Antonetti, Antonio (2018). "I vescovi e la territorialzzazione delle diocesi di Puglia, Molise, e Basilicata tra XIII e XIV secolo." . In: Rivista di storia della Chiesa in Italia Vol. 72, No. 2 (2018), pp. 379–404. 
 [Lucera]
 [Troia]
Kamp, Norbert (1975). Kirche und Monarchie im staufischen Königreich Sizilien: I. Prosopographische Grundlegung, Bistumer und  Bistümer und Bischöfe des Konigreichs 1194–1266: 2. Apulien und Calabrien München: Wilhelm Fink 1975. pp. 508–528.
Kehr, Paulus Fridolin (1962). Italia pontificia. Regesta pontificum Romanorum. Vol. IX: Samnia – Apulia – Lucania.  Berlin: Weidmann. (in Latin). Pp. 154 154-160.

Mattei-Cerasoli, Leone (1919). "Da archivii e biblioteche: Di alcuni vescovi poco noti". . In: Archivio storico per le province Neapolitane 44 (Napoli: Luigi Lubrano 1919). pp. 310–335, at 332-334.
Oldfield, Paul (2007). "Urban Government in Southern Italy, c.1085-c.1127," in: English Historical Review 122, No. 497 (2007), pp. 579–608.
Pelliccia, Alessio Aurelio (ed.). "Chronici Trojani Fragmentum." . In: Alexii Aurelii Pelliccia De Christianae Ecclesiae primae, mediae et novissimae aetatis politia Tomus Tertius. Madrid: apud viduam Joachimi Ibarra, 1795. pp. 358–372.
Rubino, G. (1997). Vescovi e personaggi illustri di Aecae e Troja. . Troia 1997.
Savino, L. (1954). La città di Troja e i suoi vescovi (1022-1954).'' . Foggia 1954

External links
Catholic Hierarchy: Lucera-Troia 
GigaCatholic: Italy, various
Diocese of Lucera-Troia official website 

Lucera
 
Lucera